Letty Green is a village in the parish of Hertingfordbury, Hertfordshire, England.

St John’s Church, Letty Green, the deconsecrated former parish church, is a grade II listed building, and Woolmer's Park country house is grade II* listed and was the source for the name of Woolmers Estate in Tasmania.

References

Villages in Hertfordshire
East Hertfordshire District